Warclouds in the Pacific is a 20-minute 1941 Canadian documentary film, part of the Canada Carries On series of short films by the National Film Board of Canada. The film was produced, written and directed by Stuart Legg and narrated by Lorne Greene. Warclouds in the Pacific, which warned of an imminent Japanese attack, was released just one week before the attack on Pearl Harbor.

Synopsis
In 1941, tensions in the Pacific were accentuated by Imperial Japan engaging in the Sino-Japanese War, as well as threatening to go to war with the other great powers in the region: Great Britain and the United States. Throughout the 1900s, global trade had allowed for great advances in industry and technology, but the militaristic government of Japan in the late 1930s, chose to align itself with Nazi Germany, further sending danger signals abroad.

In leaving behind its feudal history, Japan became an economic and military superpower but its rise to prominence had repercussions for Canada. Westerners who observed the frenzied activity in Japanese naval yards, began to leave the country, while Japanese-Canadians who had adopted their new homeland, were fearful for what might come. Western nations, including Canada, ramped up their military preparations, knowing that combatant nations already at war might soon be entangled in a Pacific conflict.

Production
Warclouds in the Pacific was the fifth of the Canada Carries On series, produced with financial backing from the Wartime Information Board, served as a portent of a future Pacific war. The documentary was created as a morale-boosting propaganda film during the World War II. Location footage in Vancouver and Victoria was supplemented by stock footage of Hong Kong.

The narrator of Warclouds in the Pacific was Lorne Greene, known for his work on both radio broadcasts as a news announcer at CBC as well as narrating many of the Canada Carries On series. His sonorous recitation led to his nickname, "the Voice of Canada", and to some observers, the "Voice-of-God". When reading grim battle statistics or, as in Warclouds in the Pacific, narrating a particularly serious topic such as Canada going to war, he was "the Voice of Doom".

Release
The film was released in Canada in November 1941. John Grierson sold the film to United Artists for distribution in the United States following its entrance in World War II. An injunction was sought by The March of Time due to the film using footage from it, but allowed its release after Grierson contacted other newsreels in order to replace The March of Time.

Reception
As part of the Canada Carries On series, Warclouds in the Pacific was produced in 35 mm for the theatrical market. Each film was shown over a six-month period as part of the shorts or newsreel segments in approximately 800 theatres across Canada. Along with others in the series, Warclouds in the Pacific received widespread circulation and, in particular, "greatly helped to draw attention to Canada's film board."

The NFB had an arrangement with Famous Players theatres to ensure that Canadians from coast to coast could see the documentary series, with further distribution by Columbia Pictures. After the six-month theatrical tour ended, individual films were made available on 16 mm to schools, libraries, churches and factories, extending the life of these films for another year or two. They were also made available to film libraries operated by university and provincial authorities.

Honours
Along with Churchill's Island, another NFB production directed by Stuart Legg, Warclouds in the Pacific was nominated for an Academy Award for Best Documentary (Short Subject), albeit losing to Churchill's Island.

Clips from Warclouds in the Pacific were used in John Kramer's documentary, Has Anybody Here Seen Canada? A History of Canadian Movies 1939-1953 (1979) and later, incorporated into Colin Browne’s 1986 documentary, The Image Before Us "... where the images of fear and war were contrasted with the reality of Canada’s wartime treatment of Japanese-Canadians."

See also
 Gateway to Asia (1945)

References

Works cited

Bibliography

 Bennett, Linda Greene. My Father's Voice: The Biography of Lorne Greene. Bloomington, Indiana: iUniverse, Inc., 2004. .
 Ellis, Jack C. and  Betsy A. McLane. "Theatrical Series". New History of Documentary Film. London: Continuum International Publishing Group, 2005. .
 Rist, Peter. Guide to the Cinema(s) of Canada. Westport, Connecticut: Greenwood Publishing Group, 2001. .

External links
 
 

1941 films
1941 short films
1941 documentary films
Black-and-white documentary films
Canadian black-and-white films
Canadian short documentary films
Canadian World War II propaganda films
English-language Canadian films
Films directed by Stuart Legg
Films produced by Stuart Legg
National Film Board of Canada documentaries
Canada Carries On
1940s Canadian films